The 1999 Major League Soccer All-Star Game was the 4th Major League Soccer All-Star Game, played on July 17, 1999, at Qualcomm Stadium in San Diego, California.
The MLS Western All-Stars defeated the MLS Eastern All-Stars, 6–4, in front of 23,227 fans at Qualcomm Stadium in San Diego.

Match

Summary

Roy Lassiter scored in the first minute of the match for the East, but their lead did not last long. Preki found an equalizer for the West in the 13th minute, and a go-ahead goal from Roman Kosecki gave them a 2–1 advantage in the 32nd minute. Cobi Jones netted one of his own in the 36th minute before another tally from Preki, who earned MVP honors, in the 38th minute gave the West a 4–1 halftime lead. A string of three unanswered second-half goals by the East brought things level once again.

A penalty kick by New England Revolution forward Joe-Max Moore in the 62nd minute, and strikes from Carlos Valderrama (73’) and Stern John (83’) capped the comeback. It would be short-lived, however. Two late goals from Mauricio Wright (84’) and Ronald Cerritos (89’) secured the victory for the West.
The MLS Western All-Stars recorded their first win over the East in three All-Star game tries. Jeff Baicher was originally scheduled to appear for the West All-Star Team but injury prevented it from happening. He would be replaced by Paul Bravo.

Details

|valign="top"|
|valign="top" style="width:50%"|

External links
 MLS All-Star Game 1999 match report

MLS All-Star Game
All-Star Game
1999 in sports in California
Sports competitions in San Diego
1990s in San Diego
July 1999 sports events in the United States